Frank Dunlop may refer to:

 Frank Dunlop (civil servant) (born 1947), Irish lobbyist, civil servant and broadcast journalist
 Frank Dunlop (director) (born 1927), British theatre director
 Frank Dunlop (footballer), Scottish footballer
 Frankie Dunlop (1928–2014), American jazz drummer